Jane, Lady Herdman (1867 1922) was a student and early patron of the University of Liverpool and was an education committee member in Liverpool in the early twentieth century. In the last year of her life (1922), her husband acquired a knighthood and she was formally known as Jane, Lady Herdman or Lady Herdman.

Early life 

Jane Herdman was the daughter of Alfred Holt, a Liverpool ship owner, merchant and engineer, and Catherine Long. The family lived at Crofton Mansion, Aigburth. In 1891, she graduated with a first class honours degree in Chemistry from the University of London, having studied science at the University College Liverpool (later to become the University of Liverpool).  She became the first President of the Women Students’ Representative Council in Liverpool, in 1892. She married William Abbott Herdman, who held the chair in Natural History at the University College, in 1893 at Toxteth Park Registry Office. They lived at Croxteth Lodge on Ullet Road.

Patronage of the university and work in education
Jane and her husband William endowed the University of Liverpool £10,000, to found the George Herdman Chair of Geology in remembrance of their son, George, who died at the Battle of the Somme. They also funded a Chair of Oceanography. 

After Lady Herdman's death in 1922, her widower made a further endowment of £20,000 towards the building of new geological laboratories which were named in remembrance of his wife.

In 1920, Mrs Herdman donated three acres of land near Greenbank Lane to the governors of Blackburne House School, to improve the sporting facilities for girls (the Holts had a long established philanthropic involvement with this school - Jane's grandfather,  George Holt, was the founder of the school). Lady Herdman was a member of the Education Committee and was chairman of the Girls School Committee from 1911 to 1922

References

1867 births
1922 deaths
English philanthropists
British philanthropists
Jane
Women of the Victorian era
Wives of knights